This is a list of the main career statistics of professional Polish tennis player Iga Świątek.

Performance timelines

Only main-draw results in WTA Tour, Grand Slam tournaments, Fed Cup/Billie Jean King Cup and Olympic Games are included in win–loss records.

Singles
Current through 2023 Indian Wells Open.

Doubles
Current through 2023 Dubai Tennis Championships

Mixed doubles

Grand Slam tournament finals 
Świątek won her first Grand Slam singles title at the French Open in 2020, defeating Sofia Kenin in straight-sets.

Singles: 3 (3 titles)

Doubles: 1 (1 runner-up)

WTA 1000 finals

Singles: 6 (5 titles, 1 runner-up)

WTA career finals

Singles: 15 (12 titles, 3 runner-ups)

Doubles: 1 (1 runner-up)

ITF Circuit finals
Świątek made her debut at the ITF Women's Circuit in 2016 at the $10K event in Stockholm, where she also won her first ITF title in singles event. Since then, she reached seven singles finals in total, winning all of them. Her most significant titles are two $60K events, NEK Open and Montreux Open, both achieved in 2018 in singles. In doubles, she reached only one final, but failed to win the title at the $15K event in Sharm el-Sheikh.

Singles: 7 (7 titles)

Doubles: 1 (1 runner-up)

Fed Cup/Billie Jean King Cup participation
Świątek made her debut at the Fed Cup playing for Poland in 2018. Since then, she has a singles record of 7–2, and a doubles record of 2–1.

Singles: 9 (7–2)

Doubles: 3 (2–1)

ITF Junior Circuit

Grand Slam tournament finals

Girls' singles: 1 (1 title)

Girls' doubles: 2 (1 title, 1 runner-up)

ITF Junior Circuit finals

Singles: 8 (6 titles, 2 runner-ups)

Doubles: 5 (3 titles, 2 runners-ups)

Team competition: 1 (1 title)

WTA Tour career earnings 
Current through 16 January 2023

Career Grand Slam statistics

Career Grand Slam tournament seedings 
The tournaments won by Świątek are in boldface, and advanced into finals by Świątek are in italics.

Best Grand Slam tournament results details
Grand Slam winners are in boldface, and runner-ups are in italics.

Record against other players

Top 10 win-loss
 She has a  record against players who were, at the time the match was played, ranked in the top 10.

Double-bagel matches

Longest winning streak 

Świątek's 37-match win streak is the longest in the 21st century and is tied for the 12th longest in the Open Era.

37-match win streak (2022)

Notes

References

External links
 
 

Swiatek, Iga